Csák may refer to:

 Csák (genus), medieval Hungarian nobility
 Csák (surname)
 Ciacova, a village in Romania